The 2015 Claro Open Colombia was a professional tennis tournament played on hard courts. It was the third edition of the tournament, and part of the 2015 ATP World Tour. It took place in Bogotá, Colombia at Centro de Alto Rendimiento, between 20 and 26 July 2015.

Singles main-draw entrants

Seeds 

 1 Rankings are as of July 13, 2015

Other entrants 
The following players received wildcards into the singles main draw:
  Nicolás Barrientos
  Daniel Elahi Galán
  Radek Štěpánek

The following players received entry from the qualifying draw: 
  Marcelo Demoliner
  Matthew Ebden
  Alejandro Gómez 
  Alexander Sarkissian

Withdrawals 
Before the tournament
  James Duckworth →replaced by Édouard Roger-Vasselin
  Vasek Pospisil →replaced by Rajeev Ram

Doubles main-draw entrants

Seeds 

 1 Rankings are as of July 13, 2015

Other entrants 
The following pairs received wildcards into the doubles main draw:
  Alejandro Falla /  Alejandro González 
  Juan Sebastián Gómez /  Eduardo Struvay

Retirements 
  Colin Fleming

Champions

Singles 

  Bernard Tomic def.  Adrian Mannarino, 6–1, 3–6, 6–2

Doubles 

  Édouard Roger-Vasselin /  Radek Štěpánek def.  Mate Pavić /  Michael Venus, 7–5, 6–3

References

External links 
 

Claro Open Colombia
Claro Open Colombia
2015 in Colombian tennis